Yeğen Osman Pasha or Yeğen Osman Aga was 17th-century Ottoman military officer of Armenian origin. After being commander of sekban (peasant mercenaries) units in Anatolia, he was appointed first to position of sanjakbey and serçeşme of the Sanjak of Karahisar-i Sahib. In 1687 for a couple of months he was also the beylerbey of Rumelia Eyalet, which was the highest position he held.

Career

Reign of Mehmed IV 
Yeğen Osman was commander of all Anatolian sekbans. Rivalries between the janissaries and the sekbans ultimately resulted in a rebellion. After the janissaries had been defeated on the Rumelian front, they marched on Istanbul in 1687 to depose Mehmed IV. The latter took action to marry his daughter to Yeğen Osman and appointed him to hold the janissaries in check. In 1687 Yeğen Osman was appointed as sanjakbey of the Sanjak of Karahisar-i Sahib in exchange for providing support to the sultan with 5,000 of his men. At his insistence, he was also appointed as security chief (serçeşme) of this province. Instead to bring his forces to the front, by the middle of May 1687 he brought around 4,000 men to Istanbul and instead to defeat forces that threaten the sultan, they actually additionally threaten him. Only 1,500 of his men were sent to the front at the end of June. To satisfy appetites of ambitious Yeğen Osman and win his support the sultan made him beylerbey of Rumelia Eyalet with seat in Sofia and responsible for exceptionally important front toward Holy League. Yeğen Osman de facto remained on the position until 1689 and treated the territories he controlled as his personal fiefdom. He increased taxes to unbearable level to earn as much money as possible for himself, though he regularly denied this when he was faced with criticism.

Reign of Suleyman II

Rebellion 
Mehmed IV to be succeeded by Suleyman II who continued the policy of his predecessor towards sekbans. Yeğen Osman, as Rumelian beylerbey, rebelled against new sultan and became the main enemy of the Ottoman government. All dissatisfied sekbans gathered around him, including many from Anatolia. The sultan offered him the position of serasker of Timișoara, but he refused. Sultan appointed him as sanjakbey of the Sanjak of Bosnia and Yeğen's uncle as sanjakbey of the Sanjak of Herzegovina, but this did not satisfy his ambitions so his forces of 10,000 men continued to plunder the territories under his control, including the Ottoman Serbia and Greece. According to some sources, Yeğen Osman had more money than Ottoman treasury.

In 1688 his forces, notorious because of the robbing of the population, robbed the treasury of Serbian Patriarchate of Peć hidden in Gračanica monastery. According to one letter written by Catholic bishop Peter Bogdani, Yeğen Osman Pasha threatened to cut off the head of Archbishop of Peć and Serbian Patriarch Arsenije III Crnojević because he received money from Austrians to instigate anti-Ottoman rebellion of Orthodox Serbs.

To bring Yeğen Osman to heels new sultan appointed Yeğen Osman on the position of governor of Belgrade in 1688. This appointment angered Yeğen Osman, because this position was subordinated to Ottoman serdar of Hungary, Hasan Pasha. He insisted that his new position would not make him subordinated to Ottoman serdar of Hungary, nor porte itself. The struggle over position of serdar of Hungary caused deep hatred between Hasan Pasha and Yeğen Osman. When Yeğen Osman went to Belgrade with his forces he forcefully deposed Hasan Pasha by capturing his camp on the Vračar hill and putting him into prison.

Siege of Belgrade 1688 

When the Holy Roman Empire forces besieged Belgrade in 1688, the emperor sent a letter to Yeğen Osman and offered him Wallachia to desert Ottomans and switch to their side. Since Yeğen Osman requested all of Slavonia and Bosnia, they did not make an agreement. Austrians positioned ponton bridges near Ostružnica and crossed Sava with 10,000 forces. Yeğen Osman attacked them with bulk of his forces, but Austrians repelled his two attacks, captured more land on the right bank of Sava and brought additional forces.

When Yeğen Osman realized that his forces were outnumbered, he burned his camp and both Serb populated Belgrade suburbs on Sava and Danube. He then retreated to Smederevo where he spent two days looting and burning it. Yeğen Osman left Smederevo and went to Niš via Smederevska Palanka. From Niš he wrote to porte reports about the siege and requested military and financial support to defend Belgrade and to annihilate rebellious rayah. He explained that Belgrade will fall if his requests would not be met within ten days. Porte sent him 120 bags of gold and decided to mobilize Muslim population of Rumelia to deal with rebelled population of Belgrade pashalik.

Last years 
Yeğen Osman, by then a Pasha, then attempted to become grand vizier. Although Yeğen Osman's ambition angered the other Ottoman statesmen they were reluctant to make an operation against Yeğen Osman for they were afraid of the  exaggerated power of Osman. However, in a war council in Edirne, Selim I Giray  the Crimean khan and a vassal of the Ottoman Empire called the Ottoman Porte to execute Osman 
When this happened, the incumbent grand vizier outlawed the sekban corps, threatening soldiers who proved unwilling to disperse with execution, and a civil war ensued. The sekbans gained the upper hand, but a further volte-face of the Ottoman central administration saw Yeğen Osman be captured and executed. This did not end the sekban's rebellions, and while in 1698 the Sultan reached an agreement with the sekbans, extending them guarantees in return for future good behaviour, the agreement was rapidly broken, and sekban's rebellions continued throughout the 18th century.

See also 
 Djemo the Mountaineer

References

Sources

Further reading 
 

17th-century Ottoman military personnel
17th-century births
1689 deaths
Year of death unknown
Ottoman governors of Rumelia
Armenians from the Ottoman Empire